Stapleford was a rural district in Nottinghamshire, England from 1894 to 1935.

It was formed under the Local Government Act 1894 from part of the Shardlow rural sanitary district in Nottinghamshire, and consisted of the parishes of Bramcote, Chilwell, Stapleford and Toton.  Two other parishes of Shardlow RSD in Nottinghamshire (Ratcliffe on Soar and Kingston on Soar) were instead administered by Shardlow Rural District.

It was abolished in 1935 under a County Review Order, becoming part of the Beeston and Stapleford Urban District along with the former Beeston Urban District.

References
https://web.archive.org/web/20110514205826/http://www.visionofbritain.org.uk/relationships.jsp?u_id=10062019

Districts of England created by the Local Government Act 1894
Rural districts of Nottinghamshire
Borough of Broxtowe